Macao Polytechnic University (MPU;) was established in 1981. It is located in the Macao Special Administrative Region (MSAR) of the People's Republic of China. MPU is a public Higher education institution with an emphasis on applied knowledge and skills.

History
Macao Polytechnic University was formerly known as the Polytechnic Institute of the University of East Asia. Following the splitting of the University of East Asia into three, the Macao Polytechnic University was established in 1991, comprising a number of schools with a long history of public education operation, including the Technical School of the Chinese Affairs Bureau, the Public Administration Training Centre, the Academy of Visual Arts and the Technical School of the Health Bureau.

Prior to 1998 the school's central building used to house the Liceu de Macau, a public Portuguese-curriculum secondary school. 

On 16 November2021, the Chief Executive of MSAR, Ho Iat-seng, delivered the Policy Address of the Government of the MSAR for the financial year 2022, announcing that the Institute will be renamed the Macao Polytechnic University. On 1 March 2022, the Macao Polytechnic Institute was officially renamed as Macao Polytechnic University.

General Information 
There are about 5,000 full-time degree programme students at MPU. Every year, MPU offers various types of training programmes with attendance of over 10,000 people at all levels. Moreover, MPU offers Master's and Doctorate degree programmes in collaboration with the University of California, Los Angeles (UCLA), Queen Mary University of London, University of Lisbon, University of Coimbra, Polytechnic Institute of Leiria, Monash University, University of Bologna, Peking University, Beijing Language and Culture University, Beijing Sport University, Chinese Academy of Governance, China Central Academy of Fine Arts, Shanghai University of Sport, Sun Yat-sen University, Chung Shan Medical University, Taiwan University of Arts, Chinese Culture University, Hong Kong Polytechnic University, Hong Kong Baptist University, and others.

Faculties and Programmes Offered

Academic Units and Research Centres

 "One Country Two Systems" Research Centre
 Centre for Gaming and Tourism Studies
 Centre for Portuguese Studies
 Engineering Research Centre of Applied Technology on Machine Translation and Artificial Intelligence, Ministry of Education
 Teaching and Learning Centre
 Centre for Continuing Education
 Seniors Academy
 International Portuguese Training Centre for Conference Interpreting
 Peking University Health Science Center - Macao Polytechnic University Nursing Academy
 Chinese-Portuguese-English Machine Translation Laboratory
 MPU-BELL Centre of English
 Language and Culture Research Centre of Macao (in collaboration with Beijing Language and Culture University and Institute of Applied Linguistics, Ministry of Education)
 Cultural and Creative Industries Teaching and Research Centre
 MPU-UCLA Joint Research Center in Ubiquitous Computing
 MPU-Melco Gaming & Entertainment Information Technology Research & Development Centre
 Centre of Sino-Western Cultural Studies
 Social, Economic and Public Policy Research Centre
 Centre for Artificial Intelligence Driven Drug Discovery

Ranking 
The University is ranked 670th in the world by SCImago Journal Rank for 2022.

The University is ranked 3835th in the world in the 2022 Webometrics Ranking of World Universities.

The University is ranked 201-300th globally for "sustainable cities and communities", as well as "decent work and economic growth", and 601-800th globally for "good health and well-being" in the 2022 Times Higher Education (THE) World University Impact Rankings.

International recognition

Accreditation 
On 13 February 2014, the University achieved the rating of "confidence", as a judgement of its Institutional Review conducted by the Quality Assurance Agency for Higher Education (QAA), UK. The judgement is equivalent to an excellent level, as awarded similarly to University of Oxford, Queen Mary University of London, etc.

On July 29, 2022, the University was accreditedfor International Quality Review (IQR) and Institutional Accreditation (IA) by QAA, met ten standards of the European Higher Education Area (ESG), including two good practices (student research and innovation as well as its comprehensive talent cultivation model) were recognised.

Programme Reviews and Professional Recognition 
Most of the programmes offered by the University have gained international recognition from various review and accreditation agencies/institutions:

Other Recognition and Honors 
The University is the only higher education institution in the country to receive the "APQN Quality Awards" by the Asia-Pacific Quality Network (APQN) three times:

 Best/Model Internal QA Award (2015 & 2017)
 Best Practice of QA during COVID pandemic (2022)

The University won the "National Teaching Achievement Award" in 2019, making it the first and only higher education institution in Macao to receive this award.

Chinese Universities Alumni Association (CUAA) released the annual "Evaluation and Study Report of Universities in China". The University was rated as a four-star university from 2017 to 2022 consecutively, ranking among China's high-level universities.

See also 
 Macao Polytechnic University Multisport Pavilion
 List of universities and colleges in Macau

References

External links

 

1991 establishments in Macau
Educational institutions established in 1991
Sé, Macau
Universities in Macau